The name Pierre David could refer to:

Pierre David (mayor)
Pierre David (film producer)